Rith is a relay race organised in support of the Irish language. It was held for the first time in 2010 and coincided with Seachtain na Gaeilge, the Week of the Irish Language. It started in Galway and finished in Belfast, traversing both the Republic of Ireland and Northern Ireland.

Rith is a spin-off from the Korrika, a relay race organised in the Basque in support of the Basque language since 1980. It has since spun off the Correllengua in Catalonia,  Ar Redadeg in Brittany and Corsa d'Aran in the Vall d'Aran.

External links
Official website (rith.ie) 

2010 establishments in Ireland
Recurring events established in 2010
Relay processions